Danielle Gibson is an American softball player. She attended Murrieta Valley High School in Murrieta, California. She later attended Arizona State University for one year, before transferring to the University of Arkansas. At both universities, she played on the school's respective college softball teams. While playing for Arizona State in 2018, Gibson helped the Sun Devils 20 the 2018 Women's College World Series, where they lost to Oklahoma, 2–0. On February 23, 2019, while playing for Arkansas in a game against SIU Edwardsville, Gibson became the second person in NCAA history to hit for a "home run cycle;" hitting a solo home run, a two-run home run, a three-run home run and a grand slam in the same game.

References

External links
 
 Arkansas bio
 Arizona State bio

Year of birth missing (living people)
Softball players from California
Living people
People from Murrieta, California
Arizona State Sun Devils softball players
Arkansas Razorbacks softball players